Jadwigowo may refer to the following places in Poland:

Jadwigowo, Kuyavian-Pomeranian Voivodeship
Jadwigowo, West Pomeranian Voivodeship